The Mud Hen 17, also called the Mud Hen, is an American sharpie, named for the bird. It was designed by the Reuben Trane and first built in 1981.

Production
The design was built by the Florida Bay Boat Company and by Sovereign Yachts in the United States, from 1981 to 1986, but it is now out of production.

Design
The Mud Hen 17 is a recreational sailboat, built predominantly of fiberglass, with wood trim. It is a gaff rigged catboat rig with a plumb stem, an angled, transom, a transom-hung rudder controlled by a tiller and a retractable centerboard. It displaces .

The boat is an open dinghy, but may be fitted with a canvas dodger.

Operational history
The boat is supported by an active class club, PeepHens.org.

See also
List of sailing boat types

References

Dinghies
1980s sailboat type designs
Sailing yachts
Sailboat type designs by Reuben Trane
Sailboat types built by Sovereign Yachts
Sailboat types built by the Florida Bay Boat Company